Pseudactium is a genus of ant-loving beetles in the family Staphylinidae. There are about 12 described species in Pseudactium.

Species
These 12 species belong to the genus Pseudactium:

 Pseudactium alexanderi Carlton & Chandler, 1994
 Pseudactium arcuatum (LeConte, 1849)
 Pseudactium carolinae Casey, 1908
 Pseudactium copelandi Carlton & Chandler, 1994
 Pseudactium magazinensis Carlton & Chandler, 1994
 Pseudactium mellinum Casey
 Pseudactium mendicum (Park, 1962)
 Pseudactium parabolicum (Brendel, 1893)
 Pseudactium pecki Carlton & Chandler, 1994
 Pseudactium stannardi Carlton & Chandler, 1994
 Pseudactium steevesi Carlton & Chandler, 1994
 Pseudactium ursum Carlton, 1995

References

Further reading

 
 

Pselaphinae
Articles created by Qbugbot